Australian Airlines was a full-service airline based in Australia, servicing Australian and Asian destinations between 2002 and 2006. It was an all-economy, full-service international leisure carrier, and was a wholly owned subsidiary of Qantas (although run independently of the mainline carrier). Its main base was at Cairns International Airport, with a secondary hub at Sydney Airport.

The airline ceased operations under its own livery on 30 June 2006, but continued to operate flights for Qantas under a wet lease agreement. This means Australian Airlines operated flights for Qantas using its own crew/cost base, but under the Qantas brand. Qantas decided to discontinue the public use of the Australian Airlines brand in favour of having Jetstar Airways as its leisure, now low-cost, carrier. Qantas and Jetstar are operating services to replace Australian Airlines' routes, with Jetstar International introduced in late 2006 to help expand the Qantas Group's international presence.

History
The airline was established in 2001 and started operations on 27 October 2002, reusing the name Qantas gained when it acquired former Australian domestic carrier Australian Airlines in September 1992. Its initial network of flights concentrated on leisure tourism between Queensland and Japan. Subsequent expansion brought on other leisure destinations throughout Southeast Asia. On 12 April 2006 Geoff Dixon, CEO of the Qantas Group, announced that the group would be focusing on a two-brand strategy, the Qantas and Jetstar brands, and as such the Australian Airlines brand would cease to exist from July 2006.

The airline's aircraft were re-painted back into the Qantas livery and returned to Qantas short-haul for use on their domestic and trans-Tasman routes. Alternative Boeing 767-300 aircraft (in Qantas two-class configuration) were supplied to Australian Airlines by Qantas, for them to operate under a wet lease agreement in the interim. Australian Airlines continued to operate under this agreement, servicing several routes to Japan including twice-daily flights to Tokyo-Narita Airport, and also flights to Manila-NAIA Airport in the Philippines.

During April 2006, Qantas confirmed that, in order to focus on its two-brand strategy of Qantas and Jetstar, the Group had decided that it would abandon Australian Airlines. On 30 June 2006, Australian Airlines ceased to exist, with the airline's Boeing 767-300s and crew to still provide services from Cairns under the Qantas brand. The following day, the airline's fleet was absorbed into Qantas's mainline fleet. The parent company closed down the Australian Airlines operation completely at the end of August 2007.

Financial performance

Destinations

At the time before it ceased operations, Australian Airlines operated scheduled services to the following destinations:

Australia
Cairns – Cairns International Airport (Main base)
Darwin – Darwin International Airport
Gold Coast – Gold Coast Airport
Melbourne – Melbourne Airport
Perth – Perth Airport
Sydney – Sydney Airport (Secondary hub)
Hong Kong
Hong Kong International Airport
Indonesia
Denpasar, Bali – Ngurah Rai International Airport
Japan
Fukuoka – Fukuoka Airport
Nagoya – Chubu Centrair International Airport
Osaka – Kansai International Airport
Sapporo – New Chitose Airport
Malaysia
Kota Kinabalu – Kota Kinabalu International Airport
Singapore
Singapore – Singapore Changi Airport
Taiwan, Republic of China
Taipei – Taiwan Taoyuan International Airport
Suspended prior to ceasing operations

Fleet
In August 2006, the Australian Airlines fleet consisted of five Boeing 767-300ER aircraft.

See also
 List of defunct airlines of Australia
 Aviation in Australia

References

External links

Defunct airlines of Australia
Defunct low-cost airlines
Qantas
Airlines established in 2001
Airlines disestablished in 2006